Feminine hygiene products are personal care products used during menstruation, vaginal discharge, and other bodily functions related to the vulva and vagina. Products that are used during menstruation may also be called menstrual hygiene products, including menstrual pads, tampons, pantyliners, menstrual cups, menstrual sponges and period panties. Feminine hygiene products also include products meant to cleanse the vulva or vagina, such as douches, feminine wipes, and soap.

Feminine hygiene products are either disposable or reusable. Sanitary napkins, tampons, and pantyliners are disposable feminine hygiene products. Menstrual cups, cloth menstrual pads, period panties, and sponges are reusable feminine hygiene products.

Types

Menstrual hygiene products 

Disposable:
Menstrual pad: Made of absorbent material that is worn on the inside of underwear to absorb a heavier menstrual flow. They are made of cellulose and are available in many different absorbencies and lengths. They may have wings and/or an adhesive backing to hold the pad in place.
Pantyliner: Similar to a menstrual pad, they are smaller, thinner and used for lighter periods, intermittent bleeding and vaginal discharge, or as a supplement to a tampon.
Tampon: Inserted inside the vagina to absorb menstrual blood, can also be used while swimming. Available in different levels of absorbency.

Reusable:
 Menstrual cup: Made of silicon, natural rubber, or plastic; is inserted inside the vagina to catch blood and/or uterine lining. Most are reusable: they are emptied when full and can be washed or boiled.
Cloth menstrual pad: Worn inside underwear; can be made of materials such as cotton, flannel or terry cloth.
Period underwear (AKA period panties): Can refer to either underwear that keeps pads in place, or absorbent underwear that can take the place of tampons and pads.
Menstrual sponge: Inserted like a tampon or cup and worn inside the body.
Towel: large reusable piece of cloth, most often used at night (if nothing else is available), placed between legs to absorb menstrual flow.

Areas of concern:
Toxic shock syndrome: The use of tampons or menstrual cups can rarely cause a dangerous condition called toxic shock syndrome, which is a rare, life-threatening complication of certain types of bacterial infections. To help prevent toxic shock syndrome, the lowest needed absorbency of tampon should be used and tampons should be changed at least every four to eight hours. Minipads should be used for light menstrual flow.

Women may have difficulty with staining of their garments or sheets during menstruation. This can be mitigated by wearing dark or black underwear or pants and sleeping on top of a towel at night.

Cleansing products 

Douches: A fluid used to flush out the inside of the vagina.
Feminine wipes: A moist, sometimes scented cloth used to wipe the vulva.

 Unscented soap: A gentle way to wash the vulva to minimize the risk of irritation.

Feminine hygiene products that are meant to cleanse may lead to allergic reaction and irritation, as the vagina naturally flushes out bacteria. Many health professionals advise against douching because it can change the balance of vaginal flora and acidity.

Risks 
The different products may carry some health risks, some of which might be proven, others speculative.

 Toxic shock syndrome: A rare illness that may occur when tampons are worn for long periods of time, although not directly linked to tampon use but caused by poison linked to bacteria of the Streptococcus pyogenes or Staphylococcus aureus type.
 Irritation: Can be caused by fragrances, neomycin (adhesive on pads), tea tree oil, benzocaine. Inflammation can also be a risk associated with some products.
 Yeast infection: A fungus.
 Bacterial vaginosis: Overgrowth of naturally occurring bacteria in the vagina that leads to a type of vaginal inflammation. The imbalance of bacteria from its natural state has been connected to bacterial vaginosis 
 Exposure to chemicals: some period underwear companies (like Thinx, Ruby Love, and Knix) are facing class action lawsuits for products containing harmful toxins like per- and polyfluoroalkyl substances (PFAS) which may be linked to adverse health outcomes like cancer.

Society and culture

According to the World Health Organization, as of 2018 there are about 1.9 billion women who are of reproductive age. In low-income countries, women's choices of menstrual hygiene materials are often limited by the costs, availability and social norms. Not only are women's choices limited but, according to the WHO and Unicef, 780 million people do not have access to improved water sources and about 2.5 billion people lack access to improved sanitation. The lack of proper hygiene leads to a harder time for women to manage feminine hygiene.

Costs and tax

Tampon tax is a shorthand for sales tax charged on tampons, pads, and menstrual cups. The cost of these commercial products for menstrual management is considered to be unacceptably high for many low-income women. At least half a million women across the world do not have enough money to adequately afford these products. This can result in missing school or even dropping out. In some jurisdictions similar necessities like medical devices and toilet paper are not taxed. Several initiatives worldwide advocate to eliminate the tax all together. In some countries, such petitions have already been successful (for example parts of the UK and the United States).

Access to products in prisons
The Federal Bureau of Prisons in the United States announced that women in its facilities would be guaranteed free menstrual pads and tampons. In section 411 of the First Step Act which was passed on May 22, 2018 states, "The Director of the Bureau of Prisons shall make the healthcare products described in subsection (c) available to prisoners for free, in a quantity that is appropriate to the healthcare needs of each prisoner".

Other social views 

Some girls and women may view tampons and menstrual cups as affecting their virginity even though they have not engaged in sexual intercourse.

For those with autism, using pads before menstruation begins may help reduce sensory issues associated with menstrual hygiene products. Prior education and practice may help familiarize an individual with body changes and the process of using products associated with menstruation. 

Menstruation may occur despite paralyzation; product use depends on the individual's personal preference.

History 

In ancient Egypt, the Roman Empire and Indonesia, various natural materials – wool, grass, papyrus – were used as tampons. In ancient Japan, the tampon was made of paper and held in place by a special binder called , and was changed up to 12 times a day.

In 18th-century Sweden, women in common society were not known to use feminine hygiene products and visible period stains on clothing did not attract much attention. A common expression for menstruation during this period was to "wear the clothes" or "wear the ", a chemise-like undergarment.

It is likely that pieces of cloth or special rags were used to collect the menstrual fluid. However, there are few records of menstrual pads from the pre-industrial era. As artifacts, the various types of menstrual pads have not been preserved or survived in any particular sense, as the cloths used were discarded when they became worn out or the need for them ceased with menopause. However, as technology evolved, commercial hygiene products were introduced in the form of the menstrual pad, also known as the sanitary napkin. In Sweden, this happened at the end of the 19th century and has been linked to an increased focus on cleanliness, personal hygiene and health that occurred in the early part of the 20th century in the wake of urbanization. By the end of the 19th century, the first commercial sanitary napkin had also been introduced on the American market by Johnson & Johnson. It was a variant of the menstrual pad made of flannel.

Advertisements and product information for sanitary pads are the primary source of knowledge about the history of sanitary pads.

Early 20th-century commercial products 
Sanitary napkins could be made of woven cotton, knitted or crocheted and filled with rags. They could be homemade for personal use or mass-produced and sold, such as in towns that had a textile industry.

The menstrual receptacle was the very earliest hygiene product to be launched as menstrual protection in Sweden, as early as 1879. It was made of rubber, like many of the hygiene articles of the time, and resembled a bowl-shaped casing that would sit on the outside of the abdomen. The menstrual receptacle is not considered to have gained much popularity.

The first half of the 20th century also saw the development of early intravaginal menstrual products similar to the menstrual cup, with an early patent dating from 1903.

Menstrual belts were another form that menstrual protection took and began to appear in the late 19th century. They were made so that the pad itself was contained in a special holder that was fastened around the waist with a belt. The pads in these designs are referred to as "suction pads" in Swedish patent documents, such as the "Suction pad for menstruation" patent from 1889. The price for a menstrual belt could be between 2.75 – 3.50 SEK and pads had to be purchased for about 4–5 SEK each, depending on the size of the pack. From the price information available, menstrual protection was likely a costly purchase that was not available to everyone.

The sanitary belt can be seen as a modern version of the menstrual belt, but more like a girdle. The function of the belt is to hold the pad in place while giving the user greater freedom of motion. In Sweden, the product was introduced in the 1940s and was in use until the 1960s. In the 1970s, the adhesive strip on the underside of the pad was introduced, allowing it to be attached to the underwear and held in place without the use of a girdle, safety pin or belt.

Historical types of menstrual hygiene products 

 Cup
 Pad
 Panty
 Sponges
 Nothing
 Sheep's wool
 Underwear
 Raw cotton
 Sanitary belt and napkin holder
 Crocheted sanitary napkins
 Clouts
 No belt
 Baby diapers
 Plants

See also

Menstrual hygiene management

References

Notes

Sources

External links